Let It Play: Selected Pieces 1979–1983 is a compilation by composer Peter Michael Hamel, released in 1987 through Kuckuck Schallplatten. In addition to two unreleased pieces, Let It Play comprises pieces from his albums Colours of Time, Bardo, and Transition.

Track listing

Personnel
O. H. Hajek – illustration
Peter Michael Hamel – piano, keyboards, pipe organ, conch, tingsha
Wolf Huber – photography
Ulrich Kraus – keyboards, production, engineering, remastering
Fernando Lippa – design

References

1987 compilation albums
Kuckuck Schallplatten compilation albums
Peter Michael Hamel albums